Adrián Nicolás Colombino Rodríguez (born 12 October 1993) is a Uruguayan professional footballer who last played as a central midfielder for Greek Super League 2 club Panserraikos.

Career
Colombino joined Montevideo Wanderers' academy system in 2006, signing from youth team Arapey Mendoza. His professional debut against Liverpool on 9 October 2011 was one of two appearances in 2011–12. Forty-one further appearances followed across two seasons, which preceded Colombino scoring his first senior goal in August 2014 versus River Plate; a ninety-third minute winner at the Estadio Saroldi. He netted goals in the next campaign against Nacional and Peñarol on the way to a total of one hundred and seventy-eight matches in all competitions in eight seasons; placing as runner-ups twice.

On 20 January 2019, Colombino completed a loan move to Argentine Primera División side Argentinos Juniors. He appeared just once for the club, playing the final fourteen minutes of a Copa Argentina win over Torneo Federal A's Douglas Haig on 5 March. Colombino went back to his parent team on 24 June, subsequently participating in July league games with Cerro Largo and Fénix. On 29 December 2020, Colombino agreed a transfer to Greek football with AEL; penning a two-and-a-half-year contract.

Career statistics
.

References

External links

1993 births
Living people
Footballers from Montevideo
Uruguayan footballers
Association football midfielders
Uruguayan expatriate footballers
Expatriate footballers in Argentina
Expatriate footballers in Greece
Uruguayan expatriate sportspeople in Argentina
Uruguayan expatriate sportspeople in Greece
Uruguayan Primera División players
Montevideo Wanderers F.C. players
Argentinos Juniors footballers
Athlitiki Enosi Larissa F.C. players
Panserraikos F.C. players